The 2022 Vermont House of Representatives election took place on November 8, 2022 as part of the biennial United States elections. The election coincided with elections for other offices including the U.S. Senate, U.S. House, Governor, and State Senate. Vermont voters elected all 150 state representatives from 109 districts, with each district electing between one and two representatives. State representatives served two-year terms. A primary election was held on August 9, 2022, and it determined which candidates appear on the November 8 general election ballot. All the members elected would serve in the Vermont General Assembly. This election was the first to use new districts adopted by the Vermont General Assembly to allocate for population changes across the state after the 2020 census.

Democrats won 104 seats in the Vermont House, attaining a veto-proof super-majority. This is the most seats Democrats have ever held in the chamber, and the most for either party since 1966.

Summary of results

Source:

Retiring incumbents
43 incumbent representatives (25 Democrats, 13 Republicans, 2 Progressives and 3 independents) had announced they would not seek reelection.
Note: districts shown are pre-redistricting

Addison-5: Harvey Smith (R)
Addison-Rutland: Terry Norris (I)
Bennington-Rutland: Linda Joy Sullivan (D)
Caledonia-1: Marcia Martel (R)
Caledonia-4: Marty Feltus (R)
Chittenden-2: Jim McCullough (D)
Chittenden-3: George Till (D)
Chittenden-4-2: Bill Lippert (D)
Chittenden-5-1: Kate Webb (D)
Chittenden-6-3: Curt McCormack (D)
Chittenden-6-4: Selene Colburn (P/D)
Chittenden-6-7: Hal Colston (D)
Chittenden-7-2: Ann Pugh (D)
Chittenden-7-3: John Killacky (D)
Chittenden-7-4: Maida Townsend (D)
Chittenden-8-1: Tanya Vyhovsky (P/D) (running for state senate)
Chittenden-10: John Palasik (R)
Essex-Caledonia-Orleans: Paul Lefebvre (I)
Franklin-1: Carl Rosenquist (R)
Franklin-2: Barbara Murphy (I)
Franklin-5: Robert Norris (R) (running for state senate)
Franklin-7: Felisha Leffler (R)
Grand Isle-Chittenden: Leland Morgan (R) (running for state senate)
Lamoille-1: Heidi Scheuermann (R)
Lamoille-3: Lucy Rogers (D)
Lamoille-Washington: David Yacovone (D)
Orange-2: Sarah Copeland Hanzas (D) (running for Secretary of State)
Rutland-3: Bob Helm (R)
Rutland-5-1: Peter Fagan (R)
Rutland-5-2: Larry Cupoli (R)
Washington-2: Rob LaClair (R)
Washington-3: Tommy Walz (D)
Washington-4: Mary Hooper (D)
Washington-4: Warren Kitzmiller (D)
Washington-5: Kimberly Jessup (D)
Washington-6: Janet Ancel (D)
Washington-7: Maxine Grad (D)
Windham-3: Carolyn Partridge (D)
Windham-6: John Gannon (D)
Windsor-3-1: Thomas Bock (D)
Windsor-4: Becca White (D) (running for state senate)
Windsor-5: Charlie Kimbell (D) (running for Lieutenant Governor)
Windsor-Orange-2: Tim Briglin (D)

Defeated incumbents

In the primary
Chittenden-5: Mike Yantachka (D)
Essex-Caledonia: John Kascenska (R)

Detailed results

Sources for election results:

Addison-1 
Elects two representatives.
Democratic primary

Republican primary

General election

Addison-2 
Elects one representative.
Democratic primary

No other candidates filed to run in the district.
General election

Addison-3 
Elects two representatives.
Democratic primary

Republican primary

General election

Addison-4 
Elects two representatives.
Democratic primary

Republican primary

General election

Addison-5 
Elects one representative.
Republican primary

Democratic primary

General election

Addison-Rutland 
Elects one representative.
Democratic primary

No other candidates filed to run in the district.
General election

Bennington-1 
Elects one representative.
Democratic primary

Republican primary

General election

Bennington-2 
Elects two representatives.
Democratic primary

No other candidates filed to run in this district.
General election

Bennington-3 
Elects one representative.
Democratic primary

Republican primary

General election

Bennington-4 
Elects two representatives.
Democratic primary

Republican primary

General election

Bennington-5 
Elects two representatives.
Democratic primary

Republican primary

General election

Bennington-Rutland 
Elects one representative.
Democratic primary

Republican primary

General election

Caledonia-1 
Elects one representative.
Democratic primary

No other candidates filed to run in the district.
General election

Caledonia-2 
Elects one representative.
Democratic primary

No other candidates filed to run in the district.
General election

Caledonia-3 
Elects two representatives.
Democratic primary

Republican primary

General election

Caledonia-Essex 
Elects two representatives.
Democratic primary

Republican primary

General election

Caledonia-Washington 
Elects one representative.
Democratic primary

No Republican candidates filed to run in the district.
General election

Chittenden-1 
Elects one representative.
Democratic primary

No other candidates filed to run in the district.
General election

Chittenden-2 
Elects two representatives.
Democratic primary

Republican primary

General election

Chittenden-3 
Elects two representatives.
Democratic primary

No other candidates filed to run in the district.
General election

Chittenden-4 
Elects one representative.
Democratic primary

Republican primary

General election

Chittenden-5 
Elects one representative.
Democratic primary

No other candidates filed to run in the district.
General election

Chittenden-6 
Elects one representative.
Democratic primary

No other candidates filed to run in the district.
General election

Chittenden-7 
Elects one representative.
Democratic primary

No other candidates filed to run in the district.
General election

Chittenden-8 
Elects one representative.
Democratic primary

No other candidates filed to run in the district.
General election

Chittenden-9 
Elects one representative.
Democratic primary

No other candidates filed to run in the district.
General election

Chittenden-10 
Elects one representative.
Democratic primary

No other candidates filed to run in the district.
General election

Chittenden-11 
Elects one representative.
Democratic primary

No other candidates filed to run in the district.
General election

Chittenden-12 
Elects one representative.
Democratic primary

No other candidates filed to run in the district.
General election

Chittenden-13 
Elects two representatives.
Democratic primary

No Republican candidates filed to run in the district.
General election

Chittenden-14 
Elects two representatives.
Democratic primary

No other candidates filed to run in the district.
General election

Chittenden-15 
Elects two representatives.
Democratic primary

No other candidates filed to run in the district.
General election

Chittenden-16 
Elects two representatives.
Democratic primary

No other candidates filed to run in the district.
General election

Chittenden-17 
Elects one representative.
Democratic primary

No other candidates filed to run in the district.
General election

Chittenden-18 
Elects two representatives.
Democratic primary

No other candidates filed to run in the district.
General election

Chittenden-19 
Elects two representatives.
Democratic primary

Republican primary

General election

Chittenden-20 
Elects two representatives.
Democratic primary

Republican primary

General election

Chittenden-21 
Elects two representatives.
Democratic primary

General election

Chittenden-22 
Elects two representatives.
Democratic primary

Republican primary

General election

Chittenden-23 
Elects two representatives.
Democratic primary

Republican primary

General election

Chittenden-24 
Elects one representative.
Democratic primary

Republican primary

General election

Chittenden-25 
Elects one representative.
Democratic primary

Republican primary

General election

Chittenden-Franklin 
Elects two representatives.
Republican primary

Democratic primary

General election

Essex-Caledonia 
Elects one representative.
Republican primary

No other candidates filed to run in the district.
General election

Essex-Orleans 
Elects one representative.
Democratic primary

Republican primary

General election

Franklin-1 
Elects two representatives.
Democratic primary

Republican primary

General election

Franklin-2 
Elects one representative.
Republican primary

No other candidates filed for the district.
General election

Franklin-3 
Elects one representative.
Democratic primary

Republican primary

General election

Franklin-4 
Elects two representatives.
Republican primary

Democratic primary

No other candidates filed to run in the district.
General election

Franklin-5 
Elects two representatives.
Republican primary

Democratic primary

No other candidates filed to run in the district.
General election

Franklin-6 
Elects one representative.
Republican primary

Democratic primary

General election

Franklin-7 
Elects one representative.
Republican primary

Democratic primary

General election

Franklin-8 
Elects one representative.
Republican primary

Democratic primary

General election

Grand Isle-Chittenden 
Elects two representatives.
Republican primary

Democratic primary

General election

Lamoille-1 
Elects one representative.
Democratic primary

General election

Lamoille-2 
Elects two representatives.
Democratic primary

Republican primary

General election

Lamoille-3 
Elects two representatives.
Democratic primary

Republican primary

General election

Lamoille-Washington 
Elects two representatives.
Democratic primary

Republican primary

General election

Orange-1 
Elects one representative.
Republican primary

Democratic primary

General election

Orange-2 
Elects one representative.
Democratic primary

Republican primary

General election

Orange-3 
Elects one representative.
Republican primary

Democratic primary

General election

Orange-Caledonia 
Elects one representative.
Republican primary

Democratic primary

General election

Orange-Washington-Addison 
Elects two representatives.
Democratic primary

Republican primary

General election

Orleans-1 
Elects one representative.
Republican primary

Democratic primary

General election

Orleans-2 
Elects one representative.
Republican primary

No other candidates filed to run in the district.
General election

Orleans-3 
Elects one representative.
Democratic primary

General election

Orleans-4 
Elects one representative.
Democratic primary

Republican primary

General election

Orleans-Lamoille 
Elects two representatives.
Republican primary

Democratic primary

General election

Rutland-1 
Elects one representative.
Republican primary

No other candidates filed to run in the district.
General election

Rutland-2 
Elects two representatives.
Republican primary

Democratic primary

General election

Rutland-3 
Elects one representative.
Republican primary

Democratic primary

General election

Rutland-4 
Elects one representative.
Republican primary

No other candidates filed to run in the district.
General election

Rutland-5 
Elects one representative.
Republican primary

No other candidates filed to run in the district.
General election

Rutland-6 
Elects one representative.
Democratic primary

Republican primary

General election

Rutland-7 
Elects one representative.
Democratic primary

No other candidates filed to run in the district
General election

Rutland-8 
Elects one representative.
Republican primary

Democratic primary

General election

Rutland-9 
Elects one representative.
Democratic primary

No other candidates filed to run in the district.
General election

Rutland-10 
Elects one representative.
Republican primary

No other candidates filed to run in the district.
General election

Rutland-11 
Elects one representative.
Republican primary

Democratic primary

General election

Rutland-Bennington 
Elects one representative.
Republican primary

Democratic primary

After winning the Democratic nomination, Hoyt withdrew his candidacy for personal reasons. He was replaced on the ballot with former Progressive Rep. Robin Chestnut-Tangerman.
General election

Rutland-Windsor 
Elects one representative.
Democratic primary

No other candidates filed for the seat.
General election

Washington-1 
Elects two representatives.
Republican primary

Democratic primary

General election

Washington-2 
Elects two representatives.
Democratic primary

No Republican candidates filed to run in the district.
General election

Washington-3 
Elects two representatives.
Democratic primary

Republican primary

General election

Washington-4 
Elects two representatives.
Democratic primary

Republican primary

Progressive primary

General election

Washington-5 
Elects one representative.
Democratic primary

No other candidates filed to run in the district.
General election

Washington-6 
Elects one representative.
Democratic primary

Republican primary

General election

Washington-Chittenden 
Elects two representatives.
Democratic primary

Republican primary

General election

Washington-Orange 
Elects two representatives.
Republican primary

Democratic primary

General election

Windham-1 
Elects one representative.
Democratic primary

<

Republican primary

General election

Windham-2 
Elects one representative.
No major party candidate filed for the seat.
General election

Windham-3 
Elects two representatives.
Democratic primary

Republican primary

General election

Windham-4 
Elects one representative.
Democratic primary

Republican primary

General election

Windham-5 
Elects one representative.
Democratic primary

No other candidates filed for the seat.
General election

Windham-6 
Elects one representative.
Democratic primary

Republican primary

General election

Windham-7 
Elects one representative.
Democratic primary

Republican primary

General election

Windham-8 
Elects one representative.
Democratic primary

Republican primary

General election

Windham-9 
Elects one representative.
Democratic primary

No other candidates filed for the seat.
General election

Windham-Windsor-Bennington
Elects one representative.
No major party candidate filed for the seat.
General election

Windsor-1 
Elects two representatives.
Democratic primary

No other candidates filed in the district.
General election

Windsor-2 
Elects one representative.
Democratic primary

No Republican candidates filed for the seat.
General election

Windsor-3 
Elects one representative.
Democratic primary

Republican primary

General election

Windsor-4 
Elects one representative.
Democratic primary

No other candidates filed for the seat.
General election

Windsor-5 
Elects one representative.
Democratic primary

No Republican candidates filed for the seat.
General election

Windsor-6 
Elects two representatives.
Democratic primary

No other candidates filed for the seat.
General election

Windsor-Addison 
Elects one representative.
Democratic primary

No other candidates filed for the seat.
General election

Windsor-Orange-1 
Elects one representative.
Democratic primary

No other candidates filed for the seat.
General election

Windsor-Orange-2 
Elects two representatives.
Democratic primary

Republican primary

General election

Windsor-Windham 
Elects one representative.
Democratic primary

Republican primary

General election

See also
 2022 Vermont elections
2022 United States elections
2022 United States House of Representatives election in Vermont
2022 Vermont gubernatorial election
2022 Vermont elections

Notes

References

House
Vermont House
Vermont House of Representatives elections